The 40th Deauville American Film Festival took place at Deauville, France from September 5 to 14, 2014. Woody Allen's romantic comedy film Magic in the Moonlight served as the opening night film. Sin City: A Dame to Kill For by Robert Rodriguez and Frank Miller was the closing night film of the festival. The Grand Prix was awarded to Whiplash by Damien Chazelle, which also won the Audience award at the festival.

The festival paid tribute to  James Cameron, Robin Williams, Lauren Bacall, Jessica Chastain, Will Ferrell, Brian Grazer, Ray Liotta, and John McTiernan and host retrospective of their films. In addition James Cameron also screened his film Deepsea Challenge 3D and received special honour as an award called 40th Anniversary Award. The festival honoured Russian-born American film and stage actor Yul Brynner with Deauville Legend award.

Juries

Main Competition
Costa-Gavras: Greek-French director and producer (President of Jury) 
Jean-Pierre Jeunet: French screenwriter and director  
Claude Lelouch: French director, writer, cinematographer 
Pierre Lescure: French journalist and television executive 
Vincent Lindon: French actor and filmmaker 
Marie-Claude Pietragalla: French dancer and choreographer
André Téchiné: French screenwriter and director

Cartier revelation jury
Audrey Dana: French actress and director (President of Jury)  
Anne Berest: French novelist and screenwriter
Lola Bessis: French screenwriter
Christine and the Queens:  French singer and songwriter
Freddie Highmore: English actor
Clémence Poésy: French actress and fashion model

Programme

Competition
A Girl Walks Home Alone at Night by Ana Lily Amirpour
After the Fall by Saar Klein
I Origins by Mike Cahill
It Follows by David Robert Mitchell
Jamie Marks Is Dead by Carter Smith
Cold in July by Jim Mickle
Love Is Strange by Ira Sachs
The Better Angels by A.J. Edwards
The Good Lie by Philippe Falardeau
A Most Wanted Man by Anton Corbijn
Uncertain Terms by Nathan Silver
War Story by Mark Jackson
Whiplash by Damien Chazelle 
White Bird in a Blizzard by Gregg Araki

Les Premières (Premieres)
Alex of Venice by Chris Messina
Anchorman 2: The Legend Continues by Adam McKay
Before I Go to Sleep by Rowan Joffé
Camp X-Ray by Peter Sattler
Chef by Jon Favreau
Deepsea Challenge 3D by John Bruno, Ray Quint and Andrew Wight
Get on Up by Tate Taylor
Infinitely Polar Bear by Maya Forbes
Land Ho! by Martha Stephens and Aaron KatzMagic in the Moonlight by Woody AllenThe November Man by Roger DonaldsonSin City: A Dame to Kill For by Robert Rodriguez and Frank MillerThe Boxtrolls by Anthony Stacchi and Graham AnnableThe Hundred-Foot Journey by Lasse HallströmThe Disappearance of Eleanor Rigby: Them by Ned Benson

Les Docs De L'Oncle Sam (Uncle Sam's Doc)Last Days in Vietnam by Rory KennedyLife Itself by Steve JamesNational Gallery by Frederick WisemanRed Army by Gabe PolskyThe Go-Go Boys: The Inside Story of Cannon Films by Hilla Medalia

La Nuit américaine (American cinema overview)All Is Lost by J. C. ChandorBeasts of the Southern Wild by Benh ZeitlinBeing John Malkovich by Spike JonzeCrash by Paul HaggisGhost World by Terry ZwigoffHedwig and the Angry Inch by John Cameron MitchellHigh Art by Lisa CholodenkoIn the Company of Men by Neil LaButeLes Misérables by Tom HooperLittle Miss Sunshine by Jonathan Dayton and Valerie FarisLiving in Oblivion by Tom DiCilloThe Long Way Home by Mark Jonathan HarrisMamma Mia! by Phyllida LloydMaria Full of Grace by Joshua MarstonMemento by Christopher NolanPrecious by Lee DanielsRay by Taylor HackfordSin Nombre by Cary FukunagaTake Shelter by Jeff NicholsThe Blues Brothers by John LandisThe Dead Girl by Karen MoncrieffThe Visitor by Tom McCarthyThirteen by Catherine HardwickeWelcome to the Dollhouse by Todd SolondzWinter's Bone by Debra Granik

Deauville Se SouvientGood Morning, Vietnam by Barry LevinsonKey Largo by John HustonDead Poets Society by Peter WeirThe Big Sleep by Howard HawksTo Have and Have Not by Howard HawksGood Will Hunting by Gus Van Sant

Hommage Deauville Legend (Tribute Deauville Legend)The Magnificent Seven by John SturgesThe Ten Commandments by Cecil B. DeMilleWestworld by Michael Crichton

TelevisionThe Strain by Guillermo del Toro and Chuck Hogan

Awards

The festival awarded the following awards:
Grand Prix (Grand Special Prize): Whiplash by Damien Chazelle
Prix du Jury (Jury Special Prize): The Good Lie by Philippe Falardeau
Prix du Public (Audience Award): Whiplash by Damien Chazelle
Prix de la Critique Internationale (International Critics' prize): It Follows by David Robert Mitchell
Prix Michel d'Ornano (Michel d'Ornano Award for debut French film): Elle l'adore by Jeanne Herry
Prix de la Révélation Cartier (Cartier Revelation Prize): A Girl Walks Home Alone at Night by Ana Lily Amirpour
Prix du 40e (40th Anniversary Award): After the Fall by Saar Klein
Lucien Barrière Prize for Literature:The Son'' by Philipp Meyer
Tributes:
James Cameron
Robin Williams
Lauren Bacall
Jessica Chastain
Will Ferrell
Brian Grazer
Ray Liotta
John McTiernan
Deauville Legend:
Yul Brynner

References

External links

 Official site
 2014 Official Press Kit
 Deauville American Film Festival:2014 at Internet Movie Database

2014 in French cinema
2014 film festivals
2014 festivals in Europe
21st century in France
Film festivals in France